Juan Gerardo de la Garza Tenorio "Chico" (born September 20, 1961) is a retired javelin thrower from Mexico, who won the bronze medal at the 1987 Pan American Games during his career.  He is currently an assistant track and field coach at Texas A&M University, coaching the throwing events.

Achievements

References
 Year Ranking

1961 births
Living people
Mexican male javelin throwers
Athletes (track and field) at the 1984 Summer Olympics
Athletes (track and field) at the 1987 Pan American Games
Athletes (track and field) at the 1991 Pan American Games
Olympic athletes of Mexico
Pan American Games medalists in athletics (track and field)
Pan American Games bronze medalists for Mexico
Central American and Caribbean Games silver medalists for Mexico
Competitors at the 1986 Central American and Caribbean Games
Competitors at the 1990 Central American and Caribbean Games
World Athletics Championships athletes for Mexico
Central American and Caribbean Games medalists in athletics
Medalists at the 1987 Pan American Games
20th-century Mexican people